Protasovo is a rural locality (a selo) and the administrative center of Protasovo Selsoviet of Nemetsky National District, Altai Krai, Russia. The population was 1174 as of 2016. There are 6 streets.

Geography 
Protasovo is located within the Kulunda Plain, 36 km north of Galbshtadt (the district's administrative centre) by road. Polevoye is the nearest rural locality.

Ethnicity 
The village is inhabited by Russians and Germans.

References 

Rural localities in Nemetsky National District